Richard Stanford (fl. 1382–1402), of Stafford, was an English politician.

He was a Member (MP) of the Parliament of England for Stafford in May 1382, 1386, September 1388, 1391, 1399 and 1402.

References

14th-century births
15th-century deaths
English MPs May 1382
English MPs 1386
Members of the Parliament of England (pre-1707) for Stafford
English MPs September 1388
English MPs 1391
English MPs 1399
English MPs 1402